Orient-Macksburg Community School District (O-M) is a public school district headquartered in Orient, Iowa.

The district, which serves Orient and Macksburg, occupies portions of Adair, Madison, Adams, and Union counties in the southwest of the state.

It is the result of the consolidation of schools in the communities of Orient and Macksburg, which occurred in fall 1960. All grades pre-kindergarten through 12th are housed in one facility in Orient; the elementary portion was built in 1979. Another elementary addition, built through spring 1998, was funded by a bond approved by voters in March 1997. The school's mascot is the Bulldog.

Schools
Orient-Macksburg Elementary School
Orient-Macksburg High School

Enrollment
The school district had a 2009-2010 certified enrollment of 212 students.

Total Enrollment (Basic Educational Data Survey (BEDS))

Projections
The Orient-Macksburg School District is projected to continue a decline in enrollment.  The Iowa Department of Education predicts an average decrease of 12 students per year over the next five years.  That would peg the district's K-12 enrollment at 126 students for the 2013-2014 school year, with an estimated certified enrollment during that year of 154 students

Faculty and staff
In 2009-2010, Orient-Macksburg employed 20 full-time and one part-time teachers.  The average regular annual salary of a full-time instructor in the district was $39,081.  An average beginning teacher saw a starting salary of $28,000.

Teachers at Orient-Macksburg carried an average 17.0 years of experience in the educational field, exceeding the state average of 14.8.  Instructors have spent a slightly longer amount of time at Orient-Macksburg compared to those at most other Iowa school districts, with an average 12.6 years in the district.  Statewide, teachers have been at their current district for 11.2 years.  The average age of instructors at the school is 45.7 years-old, older than the state average of 42.2.  Of the 20 teachers, one (5.0%) holds an advanced degree.

Orient-Macksburg's superintendent is a shared position with Prescott Community Schools.  As of the 2009-2010 school year, the superintendent was paid an annual salary of $90,000 for 260 contract days.

Technology
Orient-Macksburg's 2009-2010 student-to-computer ratio was 1.5 students per computer, nearly twice the statewide rate of 2.9 students per computer.
In the 2005-2006 school year, the district offered three courses via telecommunication.  One of those courses was available through the Iowa Communications Network (ICN).  The other two were internet classes.
During the 2009-2010 school year, the district's internet access was via the Iowa Communications Network, administered through its area education agency.  Wireless networking is available throughout the facilities.

Student makeup and diversity
In 2008-2009, the Orient-Macksburg School District reported 41.7% female students compared to 58.3% male students in K-12 enrollment.
During the same school year, White students composed 94.1% of the student body in grades K-12, while 0.0% were African-American, 1.1% Asian, 2.1% Hispanic, and 2.7% Native American.

The school district reported 0.0% of enrollment as migrants or immigrants in 2006-2007.

Early childhood/preschool
The Orient-Macksburg School District offers Shared Visions Preschool, which is accredited through the National Association for the Education of Young Children (NAEYC).  The program is one of 141 in the state of Iowa with this certification.

An early childhood special education program is also offered at Orient-Macksburg.

References

External links 
 Orient-Macksburg Community Schools
 

School districts in Iowa
Education in Adair County, Iowa
Education in Madison County, Iowa
Education in Adams County, Iowa
Education in Union County, Iowa
1960 establishments in Iowa
School districts established in 1960